The Fort Victoria or Fort II class is a class of replenishment oiler of the Royal Fleet Auxiliary, a role that combines the missions of a tanker and stores supply ship. As such they are designated auxiliary oiler replenisher (AOR). They are tasked with providing ammunition, fuel, food and other supplies to Royal Navy vessels around the world.

History

Six ships were initially planned to supply the Type 23 frigates in their North Atlantic anti-submarine role.  The Type 23 was at the time planned to be a low cost, lightly armed vessel and the Fort-class ships were therefore expected to defend themselves with the Sea Wolf vertical launch surface-to-air missile (SAM).

The lessons of the Falklands War meant the Type 23 developed as a much more potent, multi-role vessel carrying the Sea Wolf missile. The requirement for the Fort class was reduced from six to two.

Fort Victoria was built by Harland and Wolff and Fort George by Swan Hunter and the ships entered service in 1994 and 1993 respectively. Fort Victoria was delayed when she was bombed by the IRA on 6 September 1990 and nearly sunk.

Class details

See also
 Fort Rosalie or Fort I class RFA replenishment ships

Notes

Bibliography
 Beaver, Paul, Britain's Modern Royal Navy, Patrick Stephens Limited, 1996,

External links
Fort class replenshipment ships at the Royal Navy website

Auxiliary replenishment ship classes